Sandy Park is a rugby union stadium and conference and banqueting centre in Exeter, England. It is the home ground of Exeter Chiefs, who from the 2010–11 season have been playing in the Gallagher Premiership, the top flight of the English rugby union league system. The club relocated there from their former stadium at the County Ground in 2006. The stadium can hold 15,600 spectators and is located adjacent to M5 junction 30, which is around 5 miles from Exeter City Centre. 

Sandy Park played host to the England Saxons vs Ireland Wolfhounds on 28 January 2012; the England Saxons won 23–17.

Expansion
In the summer of 2012 the club announced a five-year plan to redevelop the ground to hold 20,600, which will be carried out in phases, starting with the existing west stand to provide a much larger bar area and extending the grandstand the full length of the pitch (in place of the existing temporary seating). The second phase (subject to finance) will involve building a large conference centre to the south and then extending the main grandstand around the corner and along the south end of the ground. The proposed stands behind each of the goal posts will be much larger than the existing main grandstand, but the proposed east stand will be similar in size to the main stand, due to its proximity adjacent the M5 motorway restricting its size.

The first phase of the redevelopment (costing £10million) was carried out over the summer of 2014 and Sandy Park reopened in September that year with an increased capacity of 12,500, the capacity that the stadium will have when it hosts matches at the 2015 Rugby World Cup. The Conference & Banqueting facilities of Sandy Park were also increased, doubling the capacity for conferences and other events.

The second phase was announced in July 2021 and involves expansion of the East stand to create a further 1,948 seats and taking capacity to 15,600.

2015 Rugby World Cup matches

Sandy Park was one of thirteen venues in England and Wales that hosted 2015 Rugby World Cup games.

Gallery

References

External links
Sandy Park

Rugby union stadiums in England
Exeter Chiefs
Sports venues completed in 2006
Sports venues in Devon